Liverpool Corporation Tramways operated a tramway service in Liverpool between 1898 and 1957.

History

In 1897, Liverpool Corporation bought the Liverpool United Tramway and Omnibus Company and obtained a Private Act of Parliament, the Liverpool Corporation Tramways Act 1897.

A modernisation scheme followed immediately with electrification of services taking around 5 years.

The first electric service left Dingle on 16 November 1898. By 1901, the 101 million passengers were carried by the electric tramcars.

The last tram
The last tram, (Car 293 No. 6A), ran from Liverpool's Pier Head to Bowring Park on 14 September 1957.

The car was bought by the Seashore Trolley Museum of Kennebunkport, Maine, U.S. and shipped via Boston, Massachusetts in 1958. As of 2017, it is currently at the back of a shed at the Museum, and in poor condition.

Surviving trams

Horse car 43 is a static exhibit at the Wirral Transport Museum in Birkenhead.

Car 293 survives at the Seashore Trolley Museum in Kennebunkport, Maine, United States of America.

Car 245 was restored to operational condition in 2014, by members of the Merseyside Tramway Preservation Society at the Wirral Transport Museum in Birkenhead, and is operational at the Wirral Tramway.

Car 762 is operational at the Wirral Tramway.

Car 869 (known as a "Streamliner" or "Liner" in original Liverpool service, and "Green Goddess" in later Glasgow service) is part of the operational fleet at the National Tramway Museum at Crich in Derbyshire.

Further reading
The Leaving of Liverpool (2021) Martin Jenkins and Charles Roberts

References

Tram transport in England
Historic transport in Merseyside